Damës (also, Damasi, Damësi and Damsi) is a village in the former Memaliaj Fshat municipality, Gjirokastër County, Albania. At the 2015 local government reform it became part of the municipality Memaliaj.

References

Map of the municipality

Populated places in Memaliaj
Villages in Gjirokastër County